Mortality factor 4-like protein 1 is a protein that in humans is encoded by the MORF4L1 gene.

Interactions 

MORF4L1 has been shown to interact with MYST1, Retinoblastoma protein and MRFAP1.

References

Further reading